Icon 2 is a compilation album by American country music artist George Strait. It was released on November 8, 2011.
The album is part of a series of similar Icon albums released by MCA Nashville as eleven more songs in between.  The album has sold 204,500 copies in the United States as of April 2017.

Track listing

Charts

Weekly charts

Year-end charts

References

2011 compilation albums
George Strait compilation albums
MCA Records compilation albums